Fallujah is a city in Iraq. It may also refer to:

Fallujah District, a district of Iraq.
Fallujah (band), an American death metal band.
Fallujah Barrage, a barrage in Iraq.